Splatter Up is a T-ball toy released in 1988, designed by WET Design, under the Worlds of Wonder brand. The toy was later manufactured (marketed) by Buddy-L and Wham-O. The toy has been described as a "wet version of baseball" using a garden hose attached to a foot pedal to control the water pressure that funnels the water into a stream to push a wiffle ball up into the air so it can be hit with a plastic bat.

In 1989, the Consumer Affairs Committee of Americans for Democratic Action recommended Splatter Up as a "safe and fun toy".

References

Products introduced in 1988
Sports-themed toys and games
1980s toys
1990s toys
2000s toys
Water sports
Wham-O brands
Worlds of Wonder (toy company) products
Ball and bat games
Baseball genres